The COVID-19 pandemic in the Central African Republic is part of the worldwide pandemic of coronavirus disease 2019 caused by severe acute respiratory syndrome coronavirus 2. The COVID-19 pandemic was confirmed to have reached the Central African Republic in March 2020.


Background 
On 12 January 2020, the World Health Organization (WHO) confirmed that a novel coronavirus was the cause of a respiratory illness in a cluster of people in Wuhan City, Hubei Province, China, which was reported to the WHO on 31 December 2019.

The case fatality ratio for COVID-19 has been much lower than SARS of 2003, but the transmission has been significantly greater, with a significant total death toll. Model-based simulation for the Central African Republic indicates that the 95% confidence interval for the time-varying reproduction number R t exceeded 1.0 between November 2020 and March 2021.

There are only three ventilators in the entire country.

Timeline

March 2020
 The country's first case was announced on 14 March, with the patient being identified as a 74-year-old Italian man who returned to the Central African Republic from Milan, Italy.
 There were six confirmed cases in March, with no recoveries and no deaths.

April to December 2020
 In April there were 44 new cases, in May 961, in June 2734, in July 863, in August 103, in September 118, in October 37, in November 52, and in December 45. The total number of cases stood at 50 in April, 1011 in May, 3745 in June, 4608 in July, 4711 in August, 4829 in September, 4866 in October, 4918 in November, and 4963 in December.
 Ten patients recovered in April, leaving 40 active cases at the end of the month. The number of recovered patients increased to 23 in May, 787 in June, 1606 in July, 1914 in September, 1924 in October, and 1929 in November, leaving 40 active cases at the end of April, 986 at the end of May, 2911 at the end of June, 2943 at the end of July, 2859 at the end of August, 2853 at the end of September, 2880 at the end of October, 2926 at the end of November, and 2976 at the end of December.
 The first two deaths occurred in May. The death toll rose to 47 in June, 59 in July, 62 in August, and 63 in November.

January to December 2021
 60,000 doses of the Oxford–AstraZeneca COVID-19 vaccine were delivered through COVAX and the national vaccination campaign started on 20 May.
 There were 18 new cases in January, 23 in February, 157 in March, 1250 in April, 680 in May, 3970 in June, 102 in July, 133 in August, 75 in September, 208 in October, 163 in November, and 421 in December. The total number of cases stood at 4981 in January, 5004 in February, 5161 in March, 6411 in April, 7091 in May, 11061 in June, 11163 in July, 11296 in August, 11371 in September, 11579 in October, 11742 in November, and 12163 in December.
 There were 33 active cases at the end of January, 21 at the end of February, 137 at the end of March, 1211 at the end of April, 134 at the end of May, 4337 at the end of August, 4412 at the end of September, 4559 at the end of October, 429 at the end of November, and 744 at the end of December.
 The death toll rose to 67 in March, 88 in April, 98 in May, 100 in August, and 101 in November.
 Modeling carried out by the WHO's Regional Office for Africa suggests that due to under-reporting, the true cumulative number of infections by the end of 2021 was around 2.1 million while the true number of COVID-19 deaths was around one thousand.

January to December 2022
 There were 1756 new cases in January, 306 in February, 127 in March, 7 in April, 14 in May, 276 in June, 132 in July, 101 in August, 41 in September, 337 in October, 65 in November, and 32 in December. The total number of cases stood at 13919 in January, 14225 in February, 14352 in March, 14359 in April, 14373 in May, 14649 in June, 14781 in July, 14882 in August, 14923 in September, 15260 in October, 15325 in November, and 15357 in December.
 The number of recovered patients stood at 14210 from March and May, 14520 from July to September, and 14615 in November, leaving 2491 active cases at the end of January, 2094 at the end of February, 29 at the end of March, 36 at the end of April, 50 at the end of May, 148 at the end of July, 249 at the end of August, 290 at the end of September, and 597 at the end of November.
 The death toll rose to 110 in January and 113 in February.

Statistics

Confirmed new cases per day

Confirmed deaths per day

See also 
 COVID-19 pandemic in Africa
 COVID-19 pandemic by country and territory
 COVID-19 vaccination in the Central African Republic

References